How I Became Russian is a 2019 Chinese-Russian romantic comedy film directed by Xia Hao and Akaki Sakhelashvili, written by Andrey Zolotarev and Lei Guanglin, and starring Dong Chang, Vitaliy Khaev, Elizaveta Kononowa, and Sergey Chirkov. The film is an adaptation of the 2015 Russian comedy television series of the same name. The film premiered in Russia on 17 January 2019, and opened in China on 24 January 2019. The film follows a young Chinese man named Peng Peng as he tries to win the right to marry the Russian woman he fell in love with by overcoming trials that his would-be father-in-law creates for him.

Cast
 Dong Chang as Peng Peng, Protagonist and Ira's boyfriend.
 Vitaliy Khaev as Anatoliy Platonov, Ira's father.
 Elizaveta Kononowa as Ira Platanova, Peng's girlfriend.
 Sergey Chirkov as Roman Andreevich Bistrov
 Hrant Tokhatyan as Ruben
 Natalya Surkova as female cook
 Sergey Sosnovsky as Fyodor
 Wu Yuyao as Peng Cheng
 Yang Zhiying as Peng's mother
 Li Yuwen as Peng's father
 Sheng Caixin as Grandpa
 Hong Bingyao as Hong Shisi
 Bai Feimeng as a heavy man nicknamed "Fatty"
 Luo Zhouhong as an old aunt

Production
This film was shot in both Russia and China. Filming took place in Moscow, Beijing, and Shanghai in 2018.

Release
In November 2018, the producers announced that the film was scheduled for release on January 24, 2019.

Douban gave the drama 4.7 out of 10.

References

External links
 
 
 

2019 films
2019 multilingual films
2010s Russian-language films
Chinese romantic comedy films
Russian romantic comedy films
Films shot in Shanghai
Films shot in Beijing
Films shot in Moscow
Russian multilingual films
Chinese multilingual films
2010s Mandarin-language films